Vyacheslav Vyacheslavovich Tsaryov (4 May 1971 – 22 September 2010) was a Russian professional footballer.

Club career
He made his debut in the Soviet Top League in 1990 for FC Dynamo Moscow.

Death
He died in September 2010 after an acute illness.

Honours
 Russian Premier League runner-up: 1995.
 Russian Premier League bronze: 1992, 1993, 1997.
 Soviet Top League bronze: 1990.
 Russian Cup winner: 1996.

European club competitions
 UEFA Cup 1991–92 with FC Dynamo Moscow: 6 games.
 UEFA Cup 1992–93 with FC Dynamo Moscow: 5 games.

References

1971 births
Sportspeople from Nizhny Novgorod
2010 deaths
Soviet footballers
Russian footballers
Association football defenders
FC Dynamo Moscow players
Soviet Top League players
Russian Premier League players
FC Lokomotiv Moscow players
FC Elista players
FC Khimki players
FC Sokol Saratov players
FC FShM Torpedo Moscow players